Novousmanovo (Yañı Uśman) is a rural locality (a village) in Shingak-Kulsky Selsoviet, Chishminsky District, Bashkortostan, Russia. The population was 190 as of 2010. There are 4 streets.

Geography 
Novousmanovo is located 19 km southwest of Chishmy (the district's administrative centre) by road. Verkhnekhozyatovo is the nearest rural locality.

References 

Rural localities in Chishminsky District